The Jalpaiguri Government Engineering College, abbreviated as JGEC, is an autonomous college, owned fully by Government of West Bengal, and affiliated to Maulana Abul Kalam Azad University of Technology. The courses conducted by JGEC have the approval of the All India Council for Technical Education (AICTE), and accredited by the National Board of Accreditation (NBA). JGEC is also a NAAC accredited institute. JGEC is a premier institute of technical education in West Bengal, established in the year 1961.

History 
JGEC Central building in Initial years was under the University of Calcutta. For the period between 1963 and 1999, the college was affiliated to the University of North Bengal, which handed over to the West Bengal University of Technology. Founded under the West Bengal University of Technology Act, 2000.

In 2012, the institution was granted complete autonomy by the University Grants Commission, India, thus giving it the freedom to set its own curriculum and manage its own finances.

Ranking 
In 2009 The Telegraph ranked Jalpaiguri Government Engineering college to be 3rd among the engineering colleges in the state of West Bengal in factors like infrastructure, placement record and faculty.

UG Programmes 

 WBJEE (West Bengal Joint Entrance Examination) conducted by West Bengal Joint Entrance Board for admission in Bachelor of Technology (B.Tech)
 JELET (Joint Entrance Examination for Lateral Entry) conducted by West Bengal Joint Entrance Board for admission in lateral entry in 2nd year (3rd semester) of the four year course of Bachelor Degree in Technology.

PG Programmes 

 PGET (Post Graduate Entrance Test) Conducted by PGET Board as constituted by the Maulana Abul Kalam Azad University of Technology, West Bengal for admission in Masters of Technology (M.Tech)
 GATE (Graduate Aptitude Test in Engineering)

Academic programs

Computer Science and Engineering 
The Department of Computer Science and Engineering (CSE) was introduced in year 2000.

Laboratories 

 Basics of Computer and communications Lab
 Object Oriented Programming Lab
 Operating  Systems Lab
 DBMS Lab
 Graphics and Multimedia Lab
 EDUSAT Lab
 Compiler Design Lab
 Artificial Intelligence Lab

Information Technology 
The Information Technology Department is one of the newest departments of the institute, established in the year 2000.

Laboratories 

 Computer Organization Lab
 Data Structures Lab
 Operating Systems Lab
 Networking Lab
 Database Lab
 Programming Lab

Electronics and Communication Engineering 
The Department of Electronics and Communication Engineering was established in the year 2000.

Laboratories 

 Power Electronics Lab 
 Digital & Analog Communication Lab
 VLSI Lab 
 Microprocessor Lab 
 Digital Signal Processing Lab 
 Antenna & Transmission Lines Lab
 Microwave & Satellite Communication Lab

Electrical Engineering

Laboratories 

 Basic Electrical Engineering
 Circuit Theory Electrical Machines
 Power Systems
 Electrical Measurements
 Control Systems
 Microprocessors
 Simulation
 Power Electronics and Drives

Mechanical Engineering 
The Mechanical Engineering Department is one of the oldest departments of the institute, established in 1961 with a student strength of about 400.

Laboratories 

 Workshops: Carpentry Shop, Moulding Shop, Machine Shop, Forging Shop, Fitting Shop, Welding Shop
 IC Engine Laboratory
 Fluid Laboratory CAD/CAM/CNC Programming Laboratory 
 Thermal Laboratory
 Solid Mechanics Lab
 Manufacturing and Instrumentation Lab

Civil Engineering

Laboratories 

 Concrete Technology
 Strength of Materials/Structural Engineering
 Soil Mechanics
 Highway Engineering
 Engineering Survey
 Water Resource Engineering
 Environment Engineering
 Engineering Geology
 Computer Laboratory

Student life

JGEC Hostels 
JGEC provides five hostels on campus to accommodate about 75 % of its students. Out of them, four are for male boarders and the last for female boarders. The hostels are as follows:

 Hostel 1 (P. C. Roy Hall) 
 Hostel 2 (J. C. Bose Hall)
 Hostel 3 (S. N. Bose Hall)
 Hostel 4 (N. C. Bose Hall)
 Hostel 5 (Ladies' Hostel)

Each hostel has its own mess managed by own duly elected mess committee which works under the hostel superintendent. Applications for hostel boarding are accepted at the time of admission.

Clubs

Centre For Innovation 
CFI is the Technical Society of JGEC. It has been promoting technical knowledge of the students since its establishment (2010). Along with conduction of classes, CFI deals with projects and provides adequate support to carry out the same. 

Events : ICIC, Sristi (Tech Exhibition)

Divide & Conquer(Coders club) 
CONQUER Divide & Conquer is a group of enthusiastic coders from JGEC. The club has its own Campus CodeChef Chapter (CodeChef JGEC Chapter)

Events Organised : Aarambh and Code Chronicles

JYOTI 
"JYOTI -A Ray Of Hope" is a free night school for under-privileged students, run by the students of JGEC. It was started in the year 2010 .Students from classes 3 to 10, come to Jyoti for gaining knowledge and to get a proper pathway for their studies. Jyoti has also started the preparation for Navodaya Scholarship exam for students of class 5 to 10. Activities : Regular Surveys, Health camps, performances by students in cultural events.

Entrepreneurship Development Cell 
The motive of Entrepreneurship Development Cell, JGEC is to promote entrepreneurship, start ups and provide a platform for students in and beyond the campus to portray their capabilities in the techno-business industries. 

Events : TEDX JGEC, E-Summit, B-plan.

Festivals 

JGEC has festivals like JECLAT and Sristi. JECLAT is the annual socio-cultural fest of JGEC. It is held near the time of "Holi" festival to organize an event called Rangotsav on the day of Holi. 
JECLAT includes social and cultural competitions like Wall Painting competition, T-shirt painting competition, Sudoku, Creative writing, Roadies, Treasure Hunt, Chitrayan (photography & art exhibition and competition), Damsheraz (dumb charades), Dance Fest (inter-college dance competition), Music Fest (inter-college music competition), Band Blast (band music contest), Elementary (puzzle, quiz, etc. online contests)  in addition to stage shows.

Alumni 
JGEC has various Alumni Associations set up at different places. The Alumni Association conducts seminars, and workshops at campus, arrange platform for sponsoring scholarships and sporting events around the whole year. Prominent educationalists and professionals visit campus during seminars organized by the Alumni Association. The Association works in close association with students of JGEC and the college authorities. The Alumni Association also helps the family of distressed Alumni or current students of JGEC financially through 'Distressed Fund' of the Association. Inter-class cricket tournament-'El Equipo', is one of the sporting event at JGEC organized and sponsored by the Alumni Association.

Notable alumni 
Promode R. Bandyopadhyay, inventor and Senior Research Scientist at Naval Undersea Warfare Center, Rhode Island, USA.
Vincent Pala, Member of the Indian Parliament for Shillong.
Subhashis Dey, Recipient of Hans Albert Einstein Award, 2022

See also

References

Further reading

Engineering colleges in West Bengal
Colleges affiliated to West Bengal University of Technology
Education in Jalpaiguri
Educational institutions established in 1961
1961 establishments in West Bengal